is a Japanese voice actress associated with the talent management firm 81 Produce. She has voiced in a number of anime shows and video games, most notably as Maki in the Burn Up! anime series and Kan Kumanoff in Maple Town.

Filmography

Anime

Film

Video games

References

External links
 Official agency profile 
 
 
 

1964 births
Living people
Voice actresses from Tokyo
Japanese video game actresses
Japanese voice actresses
81 Produce voice actors
20th-century Japanese actresses
21st-century Japanese actresses